Arts Council England is an arm's length non-departmental public body of the Department for Digital, Culture, Media and Sport. It is also a registered charity. It was formed in 1994 when the Arts Council of Great Britain was divided into three separate bodies for England, Scotland and Wales. The arts funding system in England underwent considerable reorganisation in 2002 when all of the regional arts boards were subsumed into Arts Council England and became regional offices of the national organisation.

Arts Council England is a government-funded body dedicated to promoting the performing, visual and literary arts in England. Since 1994, Arts Council England has been responsible for distributing lottery funding. This investment has helped to transform the building stock of arts organisations and to create much additional high-quality arts activity.

On 1 October 2011 the Museums, Libraries and Archives Council was subsumed into the Arts Council in England and they assumed the responsibilities of the council.

History
The Arts Council of Great Britain was created in 1946 by Royal Charter on the initiative of John Maynard Keynes.  It received a revised charter in 1967.  On 1 April 1994, it was divided to form the Arts Council of England, the Scottish Arts Council, and the Arts Council of Wales, each with their own new Royal Charter; the Arts Council of Northern Ireland already existed as a distinct body. At the same time, the National Lottery was established and the Arts Council of England became one of the distribution bodies. This increased responsibility saw the Arts Council of England grow back in size to the point where it was larger than before the 1987 restructuring.

In 2001 Chairman Gerry Robinson announced a further restructuring in which the Arts Council of England would be merged with the ten regional arts boards to form a single organisation: Arts Council England.

Let's Create
In 2020, Arts Council England published 'Let's Create', a new 10-year Strategy for the sectors within its remit.

'Let's Create' includes a new vision statement, designed to inform Arts Council England's work and priorities to 2030:

"By 2030, we want England to be a country in which the creativity of each of us is valued and given the chance to flourish, and where every one of us has access to a remarkable range of high-quality cultural experiences."

The Strategy is structured around three outcomes:

 Creative People
 Cultural Communities
 A Creative and Cultural Country

Arts Council England has also set out 4 'investment principles':

 Ambition and quality
 Dynamism
 Environmental responsibility
 Inclusivity and relevance

Governance and administration
Arts Council England has a national council of 15 members, including the chair. The national council meets ten times a year and is made up of representatives of the arts community with five of the members also representing the area councils. Each area council has a board of 15 members made up of representatives of their arts community and local government. There are five area councils:

 North
 Midlands 
 London
 South East 
 South West 

The chief executive of the Arts Council England is appointed by the Department of Culture, Media and Sport. Alan Davey was chief executive from 2008 to 2014. He was succeeded by Darren Henley. Each area council has an executive director and each art form has a specialist advisor. The Arts Council England divides its funding into the following headings:

 Combined Art (Festivals)
 Dance
 Education

 Literature
 Music
 Research

 Theatre
 Touring
 Visual Arts

Chairs of Arts Council England
 Grey Gowrie (foundation–1998), 2nd Earl of Gowrie, former Arts Minister, poet and art dealer
 Sir Gerrard Robinson (1998–2004), businessman and executive
 Sir Christopher Frayling:(2004–February 2009); Rector of the Royal College of Art (London) 
 Dame Elizabeth Forgan (2009–2013); broadcaster and journalist
 Sir Peter Bazalgette (2013–2016); Executive Chairman of ITV plc
 Sir Nicholas Serota (2017–); former Director of the Tate

Executive officers

Mary Allen: Secretary General, 1994 –1997

Peter Hewitt: Chief Executive, 1997–2008

Alan Davey: Chief Executive, 2008–2014

Darren Henley Chief Executive, 2014 to present

Funding programmes 
Arts Council England is a distributor of a core funding programme, complemented by National Lottery funding.

Culture Recovery Fund
In 2020 it administered the Culture Recovery Fund to arts venues and organisations in England affected by the COVID-19 pandemic

Former funding programmes

Arts Capital Lottery 
From 1994 it oversaw a national capital fund with grants for new buildings, public art and the renovation of existing arts buildings. The story of the Capital programme is told by Prue Skene who chaired the Lottery Panel, in Capital Gains: how the national lottery transformed England's arts.

Sampad Arts
Arts Council England utilises public funding to support Sampad Arts, a Birmingham-based agency that produces dance, music and theatre productions, and provides professional development for young artists, in association with mac (formerly the Midlands Arts Centre).

Museums
Arts Council England supports a limited number of museums as Major Partnership Museums: 16 single museums or consortia were supported 2012–2015, and a further five were added for 2015–2018, bringing the total to 21. Arts Council England also supports other museums via "Strategic Funds."

Criticism
The Council attracted criticism from the Parliamentary select committee responsible for its oversight for supporting a lottery-funded programme to subsidise UK film production that resulted in a series of films that failed to find distribution. There was also a series of costly capital projects such as the Royal Opera House and the Lowry Centre that required additional funding. In the case of the Royal Opera House the select committee found the Arts Council had broken its own procedures. In 2005 it was announced that the Arts Council England's budget was capped resulting in an effective £30m reduction in its budget.

The Arts Council of England funds a controversial cultural festival, the Festival of Muslim Cultures.

In March 2006, the Arts Council announced a review of its National Office that would "enhance efficiency and delivery while continuing to provide respected and focused arts leadership and drive", while proposing to lose 42 posts, mainly arts specialists, so that the organisation will no longer have dedicated national leads for areas including contemporary music, interdisciplinary art, moving image, architecture, broadcasting, opera, social inclusion, and disability.

Arts Council England's music policy was controversial within the jazz world. Chris Hodgkins, in his 1998 paper Jazz in the UK, pointed out that more than 90% of its music budget went on opera while jazz, with an equivalent audience size, received less than 1%. The funding landscape has improved since with funding for NWJazzworks and Manchester Jazz Festival 2012. Among other areas funding has diversified into youth music such as National Youth Choirs of Great Britain, National Youth Jazz Collective and South Asian Music Youth Orchestra (SAMYO) etc. On 11 May 2006 it was raised in the House of Lords by Lord Colwyn, as documented in the Lords Hansard Columns (1058 to 1060).

In May 2015, the right wing Board of Deputies of British Jews, released a statement objecting to Arts Council England's funding of The Siege. The Palestinian play depicts a 2002 incident where armed Hamas fighters sought refuge in Church of the Nativity in Bethlehem. A 39-day siege ensued, and eight of the Hamas troops were killed by Israeli snipers, before the remaining forces surrendered.

The English Touring Opera attributed its firing of white musicians in 2021 to "firm guidance" from the Arts Council.

See also
 Creative Partnerships
 Community art
 Artsmark
 Audiences London
 State planning

References

External links
Arts Council England consultation website
Arts Council England
Artists taking the lead
Arts energy
Arts jobs
Own art
Take it away

Arts councils of the United Kingdom
Bloomsbury
Performing arts in England
English art
Arts organisations based in England
Organisations based in England with royal patronage
Organisations based in the London Borough of Camden
Non-departmental public bodies of the United Kingdom government
Department for Digital, Culture, Media and Sport
1994 establishments in England
Governance of England
Government agencies established in 1994
Funding bodies of England
Arts organizations established in 1994